Mile Cărpenișan (August 23, 1975 – March 22, 2010) was a war correspondent who covered the wars in Iraq, Kosovo and the effects of the tsunami in Asia. He died due to a septic shock at the age of 34.

Biography

Cărpenișan was born in Timișoara into a family of Serbian origins. He studied at the city's Dositej Obradovici Serbian High School. Afterwards, he went to the University of Craiova, to the Faculty of Management. He also made an intensive 4-year specialization in audiovisual media in Lyon, France.

Cărpenișan debuted in newspapers and continued his career as a local correspondent for Antena 1. He worked for more than ten years as a reporter for Antena 1 and Antena 3, being one of the first Romanian international correspondents. He became well known for his numerous reports about the wars in Iraq and Kosovo, the revolution in Belgrade, the effects of the tsunami in Indonesia and the floods in Banat and Moldova.

While in Iraq, Cărpenișan played a major role during the seizure of three Romanian correspondents in Baghdad:Marie Jeanne Ion, Sorin Miscoci and Eduard Ovidiu Ohanesian.

In 2009 he left Antena 1 and he became a freelancer. That year, he got married with a Romanian journalist called Ramona. They created a travel agency promoting the area of Montenegro.

Mile Cărpenișan died the 22 March 2010, due to a boil after being in coma because of a septic shock. He died at the Timișoara County Hospital and was buried in his hometown.

The Mile Cărpenișan's Challenge

Mile Cărpenișan was an altruist person who believed that people should do good things for each other. Attending to that, he created the "Mile Cărpenișan’s Challenge", a massive call to action to the society. Cărpenișan challenged people to make, daily, one good thing over a week and to see the results of their actions and their personal satisfaction.

Only two weeks before his death Cărpenișan was working hard in order to organize a fundraising and get the money for a bone marrow transplant for Daniel Raduta, a young man who was dying of leukemia.

Posthumous recognition

Romanian president Traian Basescu posthumously offered him the National Order ‘Faithful Service’ in Knight Degree. Besides, the Timișoara's deputy mayor Sorin Grindeanu made Mile Cărpenișan an honorary citizen of the city.
 
The Romanian minister of Defence, Gabriel Oprea, said that "He was a man of high value, a strong and respected voice among the elite of Romanian war correspondents, a journalist that did his noble job with outstanding courage. Through repeated presence in conflict zones alongside Romanian soldiers, he became a veritable brother in arms, a rightful member of the Romanian Army’s great family"

Professional experience

1993 – First place in the international literary contest "Mladi knizevnik-Donij Milanovac" with his "Life behind bars" – an essay inspired upon the life of his father, a former political prisoner. The work was published in Yugoslavia
1995 – Cărpenișan participated in the movie "Timișoara without water". It was presented in the international documentary film festival FILMFEST Zlatibor. The film achieved the fourth place of ninety-seven and was shown at the festival and in the Romanian and Yugoslav media
1996 – "Way of War" – a documentary of twenty episodes made after a shift in the conflict in Croatia and later Bosnia-Herzegovina
1997 – "Traveler in Wonderland", a ten-episode documentary made in Africa
1997 – "I met happy gypsies", a documentary which won the Soros Foundation award in a conference about intercultural and tolerance
1999 – Correspondence about miners, for Antena 1
1999 – Cărpenișan was the only Romanian reporter in the front of Kosovo from the first to the last day.
2000 – Correspondence from the scene about the war in Yugoslavia
2001 – Reports and correspondence from the scene about the arrest of Slobodan Milosevic
2003 – Reports and correspondence about the assassination of Serbian Prime Minister Zoran Dindic
2003 – Correspondence and reports from the front in Baghdad, where he went as an embedded journalist within the United States Army
2003 – Cărpenișan wrote a report in depth about the Romanian women kidnapped by traffickers of human beings with images and exclusive interviews.
2004 – He covered the conflicts in Belgrade and Kosovo, and broadcast live reports about fights between Albanians and Serbs in the territory.
2004 – Cărpenișan published a complete report about trafficking networks that operate in Bucharest-Timișoara-Belgrade-Italy.
2004 – Cărpenișan became the only journalist who had achieved an interview with Miron Cozma
2005 – He became the first Romanian journalist at the tsunami in Sri Lanka, Thailand and Indonesia
2005 – Cărpenișan was the only Romanian TV reporter in Baghdad at the time of the journalists’ kidnapping
2005 – He covered floods in Banat and in Moldova
2006 – Cărpenișan covered the Kosovo riots
2006 – Cărpenișan provided an exclusive insight about Budapest's street fights
2007 – Cărpenișan He covered new conflicts in Budapest
2007 – Cărpenișan filmed from the front of the war in Kosovo

Between 1998 and 2007, Cărpenișan produced about 60,000 news and reports.

References

External links
Mile Cărpenişan's blog

1975 births
2010 deaths
Romanian journalists
Romanian war correspondents
Writers from Timișoara
University of Craiova alumni